Abdoulaye Soumah (born November 12, 1985, in Conakry) is a Guinean football player whocurrently plays for AS Batè Nafadji.

Career
Soumah played professional for USM Alger and OMR El Annasser in the Algerian league.

External links
DZFoot Profile

1985 births
Living people
Guinean footballers
USM Alger players
Guinean expatriate sportspeople in Algeria
Sportspeople from Conakry
Expatriate footballers in Algeria
Fello Star players
OMR El Annasser players
Association football goalkeepers
Guinean expatriate footballers